The 1892 United States presidential election in Iowa took place on November 8, 1892. All contemporary 44 states were part of the 1892 United States presidential election. Voters chose 13 electors to the Electoral College, which selected the president and vice president.

Iowa was won by the Republican nominees, incumbent President Benjamin Harrison of Indiana and his running mate Whitelaw Reid of New York by a margin of 5.29%. This was the first election in which Iowa voted for a different candidate than Wisconsin, a phenomenon that has occurred only 5 times since - 1924, 1940, 1976, 2004, and 2020.

This election resulted in Cleveland becoming the third US president of only 6 and the second of only 4 Democrats to have ever held office without winning Iowa in an election since it’s admission to the union in 1846.

Results

Results by county

See also
 United States presidential elections in Iowa

Notes

References

Iowa
1892
1892 Iowa elections